Tapeta  is a town in eastern Liberia. It is located in Nimba County. It is the seat of Liberian quiz god, Phil Tarpeh Dixon. The great-grandson of Old Man Tarpeh.

Populated places in Liberia
Nimba County

.